Aconitum violaceum is a species of perennial plant distributed in the Himalayan region of India, Pakistan, and Nepal. The plant is used in traditional Tibetan medicine. It has a bitter taste and a cooling tendency.

References

External links
http://www.impgc.com/plantinfo_A.php?id=388

violaceum
Flora of West Himalaya
Flora of Pakistan
Flora of Nepal